Start Hill may refer to:
Start Hill (Antarctica)
Start Hill, Essex, a populated place in England